Jerry Lo (born November 19, 1972, Los Angeles, California) also known as DJ Jerry, is a singer, songwriter and DJ of hands up, hard trance, hip-hop and house, who was very popular in Taiwan in the 1990s and the 2000s (especially 2006). He was one of the first American born Taiwanese singers to become famous in Taiwan, along with the L.A. Boyz. During the late 1990s, he changed his style into electronic music and started going by the name of DJ Jerry.

He has composed music for many artist, movies and commercials such as 7-Eleven and the Japanese station NHK. He also has recorded in Madonna's studio with producer John Freyer and has been asked to DJ for the leader of Taiwan. He is now a DJ in one of the largest clubs in Taiwan. He tours the world from Japan to Hollywood and China. He was also voted No.3 in the world out of the Internet top 100 DJs. Many people call him the No.1 DJ in Asia and compared to Tiesto, the number 1 DJ in the world.

His song "Jiche Nühai" (機車女孩), which means Scooter Girl, has circulated the Internet under the name "Ugly Girl" by Tai Mai Shu. Contrary to popular belief, this song is not by Tai Mai Shu, nor is it called "Ugly Girl".

References

1971 births
Living people
American musicians of Taiwanese descent
Taiwanese singer-songwriters
Singers from Los Angeles
Taiwanese hip hop musicians
21st-century American male singers
21st-century American singers
21st-century Taiwanese male singers